70 and 72 Micklegate is a shop in the city centre of York, in England.

The building originated around 1500, as a two-storey timber-framed house, on the north side of Micklegate, a major route into the city.  In the 17th-century, a third storey was added, and around the same time, the whole building was extended to the rear.  From 1802, the building was occupied by a saddler, who sublet parts of the large house, and made extensive alterations.  The building was refronted in 1823, and further extensions were added to the rear.  The rear extensions were partially demolished and rebuilt between 1970 and 1980.

The building's facade is of dull red brick with narrow mortared joints.  There are bow windows at first floor level, and at roof level there is a cornice and an early drainpipe.  The ground floor shopfront is 20th-century, although an early fanlight survives above the door to number 70.  Inside, 17th-century doors survive in the attic of 70, while there is a reused door from about 1700 on the second floor.  The decoration in the front room on the first floor dates from the Regency period, and the staircase is from the 1800s.  In 72, the staircase and much of the decoration dates from around 1810.

From 1948, the entire building was occupied by Ken Spelman Books, until it closed in January 2022.  The building has been Grade II* listed since 1954.

References

Micklegate, 70-72
Micklegate